Ángel Remigio Hermoso (October 1, 1947 – August 21, 2020), commonly known as Remy Hermoso (er-mo'-so), was a Venezuelan Major League Baseball shortstop and right-handed batter who played for the Atlanta Braves (1967), Montreal Expos (1969–70) and Cleveland Indians (1974).

A native from Carabobo State, Venezuela, Hermoso was signed by the Braves as an amateur free agent before the 1967 season.

In a three-season career, Hermoso hit .211 (47-for-223) with three doubles, one triple, 25 runs, and eight RBI in 91 games.

In 2015, he was enshrined into the Venezuelan Baseball Hall of Fame and Museum.

Hermoso died on August 21, 2020 at the age of 72.

See also
 List of players from Venezuela in Major League Baseball
 Montreal Expos all-time roster

Sources

External links
, or Pura Pelota (Venezuelan Winter League)

1946 births
2020 deaths
Atlanta Braves players
Austin Braves players
Buffalo Bisons (minor league) players
Caracas Metropolitanos players
Cardenales de Villahermosa players
Cleveland Indians players
Llaneros de Portuguesa players
Major League Baseball players from Venezuela
Major League Baseball shortstops
Minor league baseball coaches
Montreal Expos players
Navegantes del Magallanes players
Oklahoma City 89ers players
Peninsula Whips players
People from Carabobo
People from Puerto Cabello
Richmond Braves players
Shreveport Braves players
Tiburones de La Guaira players
Vancouver Mounties players
Afro-Venezuelan
Venezuelan baseball coaches
Venezuelan expatriate baseball players in Canada
Venezuelan expatriate baseball players in Mexico
Venezuelan expatriate baseball players in the United States
Winnipeg Whips players